Mickaël Castejon (born 21 March 1985) is a French professional footballer who currently plays for FC Stade-Lausanne-Ouchy. He also holds Spanish citizenship.

External links
 

1985 births
Living people
French footballers
French expatriate footballers
French expatriate sportspeople in Switzerland
Expatriate footballers in Switzerland
Association football goalkeepers
FC Lausanne-Sport players
Swiss Challenge League players
People from Libourne
Sportspeople from Gironde
Footballers from Nouvelle-Aquitaine